The Hellenic Union of Romania (UER; , EER) is an ethnic minority political party in Romania representing the Greek community.

History
The UER contested the 1990 general elections, and despite receiving only 0.04% of the vote, it won a single seat in the Chamber of Deputies under the electoral law that allows for political parties representing ethnic minority groups to be exempt from the electoral threshold. It has won a seat in every election since.

Electoral history

References

External links
Official website

Non-registered political parties in Romania
Political parties of minorities in Romania